Anatoly Nikolayevich Alyabyev (12 December 1951 – 11 January 2022) was a Soviet biathlete.

Life and career
Alyabyev was born in the village of Danilkovo, Velsky District, Arkhangelsk Oblast. He initially trained at Children and Youth Sport School of Spartak in Vologda, but competed as a senior while training at the Armed Forces sports society in Leningrad. At the 1980 Olympics he was, together with Frank Ullrich the dominant biathlete taking gold medals in the 20 km and on the relay and bronze in the 10 km. Alyabyev best season came in 1980–1981, when he became second overall.

Alyabyev was awarded Order of the Red Banner of Labour (1980). He graduated from Lesgaft Military Institute of Physical Culture in 1981 and defended a dissertation for the Candidate of Pedagogical Science degree in 1997. He died from COVID-19 in Saint Petersburg on 11 January 2022, at the age of 70.

Biathlon results
All results are sourced from the International Biathlon Union.

Olympic Games
3 medals (2 gold, 1 bronze)

World Championships
2 medals (2 bronze)

*During Olympic seasons competitions are only held for those events not included in the Olympic program.

Individual victories
2 victories (1 In, 1 Sp)

*Results are from UIPMB and IBU races which include the Biathlon World Cup, Biathlon World Championships and the Winter Olympic Games.

References

External links
 
 
 

1951 births
2022 deaths
Honoured Masters of Sport of the USSR
Recipients of the Order of the Red Banner of Labour
Spartak athletes
Soviet male biathletes
Biathletes at the 1980 Winter Olympics
Olympic biathletes of the Soviet Union
Medalists at the 1980 Winter Olympics
Olympic medalists in biathlon
Olympic bronze medalists for the Soviet Union
Olympic gold medalists for the Soviet Union
Biathlon World Championships medalists
Sportspeople from Arkhangelsk Oblast
Deaths from the COVID-19 pandemic in Russia